Ahn Sahng-hong (
; 13 January 1918 – 25 February 1985) was a South Korean Christian minister and founder of the Church of God Jesus Witnesses. In 1948, after receiving the baptism of the Seventh-day Adventist priest, he began to call for the restoration of the truth of the New Testament and the last religious reformation. In 1964, he officially established the Church of God Jesus Witnesses in Busan. Ahn Sahng-hong believed that Catholic and Protestant Sundays, Christmas, Thanksgiving, and wearing the cross should not be observed because they are not biblical doctrines, and he advocated the observance of Sabbath and the seven festivals including Passover, Pentecost and Sukkot.

On 15 April 1984, the last Passover Assembly was held in Gangdong District, Seoul; on 10 January 1985, the Provisional General Assembly was established in Seoul and a special conference was held. Both organizations claim him as their founder: the New Covenant Passover Church of God sees Ahn as a teacher; the World Mission Society Church of God sees Ahn as God.

Early life 
Ahn was born to Buddhist parents on 13 January 1918 in the small, rural village of Myeongdeok-ri in the North Jeolla Province at a time when Korea was under Japanese rule. The family migrated to Busan, where Ahn grew up in the Haeundae District, the city in which he would later found his church.

Conversion to Christianity 
From 1937, during the Second Sino-Japanese War and World War II, Ahn and his mother lived in Japan over a nine-year period. He returned to Korea in 1946, after the war, and began attending the local congregation of the Seventh-day Adventist Church in Incheon in 1947. Ahn reported getting revelations in 1953, renounced his Buddhist faith, and was baptized in 1954.

Own church 
Ahn grew critical to teachings in the Seventh-day Adventist Church, and the church disfellowshipped him in March 1962 over disputes about the cross as a religious symbol.Twenty-three people followed Ahn and left the church, and two years later on 28 April 1964, Ahn established his church Church of God Jesus Witnesses. Church of God Jesus Witnesses expanded to 13 congregations in South Korea before Ahn's death in 1985.

Beliefs 
Major dogmata are outlined in Doctrine Manual of the Church of God Jesus Witnesses (1972), and detailed in the more than two dozen books Ahn wrote. His original publications as well as scans of his notes and extant sermons have been made available online. Ahn argued that the practice of the apostolic early church had been distorted and his restorational doctrines and practices included:
 Women should wear headcovering while praying.
 Baptism is the first step towards salvation.
 The Sabbath should be kept on Saturdays, not Sundays.
 Christmas should not be celebrated as Jesus' birthday because it is the anniversary of the sun god.
 The cross is considered a form of idolatry.
 The Passover and Festival of Unleavened Bread should be kept.
 Keeping the feasts in : First Fruits, Festival of Weeks, Feast of Trumpets, Day of Atonement; and Feast of Tabernacles.

The Second Coming of Christ and Elijah's Mission 
Ahn, who like most Christians believed in the Second Coming of Jesus, had predicted a Second Coming "within 10 years" in 1956. Ahn Sahng-hong mentioned in "The Mystery of God and the Spring of the Water of Life" that therefore by studying the work of Moses, we can clearly find out the true situation about the relationship between Jesus and us, all the work that Christ will do in the future, and even about the appointed date of Jesus' second coming. Ahn Sahng-hong also said that many false Christ would say "I am the Christ" now, just as Jesus predicted that false Christs would appear in the last day, however, salvation is found in no other name than Jesus, not only at His first coming but even in the last days.

Chapter 36 "Elijah will be sent" is one of the chapters deleted by the WMSCOG, which mainly describes Elijah's mission. The main point is that the last prophet Elijah was the one to convey the last truth of preparing the way for the Second Coming of Jesus and transform and ascend along with the live 144,000 saints.

Eschatology 
In the tradition of Seventh-day Adventist eschatology, which had been suppressed by Kuniaki Koiso during his wartime rule of Korea, Ahn further believed that he was living in the end times and that the Second Coming was imminent.

It was suggest that the world could come to an end in 1988, 40 years after the independence of the modern state of Israel. Ahn's original The Mystery of God and the Spring of the Water of Life is made available online; World Mission Society Church of God in their later editions of the book have deleted information pertaining to the failed prediction. Not only that, but The Bridegroom Was a Long Time in Coming, and They All Became Drowsy and Fell Asleep, which further explained that 1988 was the end of the world:

This means that Ahn Sahng-hong in his book "The Bridegroom Was a Long Time in Coming, and They All Became Drowsy and Fell Asleep" said that 1988 was correct, but it may be very slow. In addition, in a discussion based on scriptural typology, presented his conclusion that the world would come to an end in 2012:

Mother 
Although Ahn Sahng-hong's "The Mystery of God and the Spring of the Water of Life" mentioned, in the last days, the entities of Adam and Eve, namely the Holy Spirit and the bride, appeared to lead all the animals. The Holy Spirit and the bride are interpreted as the second coming Christ and the mother God. But Ahn Sahng-hong explained in "Guests Who came From the World of Angels" that Adam represents Jesus who was in the world of angels before the creation, and Eve represents the angels whom Jesus loved. Ahn Sahng-hong came to the conclusion, Jesus is the last Adam, and the saints who are redeemed can be called the last Eve.

Ahn Sahng-hong's "Walk with God" sermon notes have the following content: "Jesus keeps the Sabbath, so I keep the Sabbath; Jesus keeps the Passover, so I also keep the Passover; Jesus keeps the Feast of Tabernacles, so I also keep the shed Festival; Jesus was baptized, so I followed him to be baptized. Elisha followed Elijah; Joshua followed Moses; Peter followed Jesus; I followed mother". This is the WMSCOG believes that Ahn Sahng-hong taught Evidence of Mother God. The NCPCOG said that mother means Sarah, which represents the New Testament.

Um Sooin 
By 1978 a group of people centered around a female member, one Um Sooin (born 1941), within the Church of God Jesus Witnesses, claimed through a chain of scriptural eisegesis that they published in writing, that Um variously was "the only bride", "the Heavenly Jerusalem", "the New Jerusalem" on earth, "the comforter sent by God", and they asserted that she was "our mother who has come down from Heaven", and that Ahn was Christ. Um and the group around her claiming she was the spiritual mother were expelled from the church, and Ahn dedicated a book entitled Problems with the New Jerusalem, the Bride and Women's Veils (1980, reprinted 1983) to the controversy, in which he writes:

Ahn concludes his rebuking of Um Sooin:

Zahng Gil-jah 
Ahn Sahng-hong's book "uncover seven thunder" published in 1955 describes: "this discourse is not my private speech, nor is it learned from anyone. But when our Lord Jesus Christ shone on me and gave me this light, the whole world looked like a dark night. When he shines his light on all sides of the earth, no one can receive it. Finally, it struck me and another person, who was still a child. This man is the one I will come to in the future. When the time comes, he will appear." According to the WMSCOG, in 1955, because Zahng Gil-jah was only 12 years old, she was described as a child and would appear after Ahn Sahng-hong. However, Ahn Sahng-hong wrote in a notebook: "the beautiful deer fell to the ground. A man in white accepted the deer and gave it to me, and it became a child. The child came to me and left. I followed the child in the clouds of heaven. When a son of man gave out a light to illuminate the earth, the light was shining in all directions. But darkness is still everywhere, and no one can reflect that light. At last the light turned to where I was, illuminating the child and me." The NCPCOG explained that the beautiful deer represents a true Church of God. Like a child, it has accepted the truth of the seven thunder. It is a clean beast in the Bible, not Zahng Gil-jah. Because Zahng Gil-jah was baptized in 1969 as a Church of God Jesus Witnesses, it can even be said that Ahn Sahng-hong did not know Zahng Gil-jah at that time.

The WMSCOG said that during the last Passover Assembly on 15 April 1984, Ahn Sahng-hong witnessed God the Mother at the wedding hall and asked Zahng Gil-jah to pray at the pulpit. The NCOCOG believes that this is because the church in Seoul is growing fast and the church gathers 300 people, so Ahn Sahng-hong celebrates the Passover in the wedding hall. Previously, in the late 1970s, many people also celebrated Passover at the Busan Sea Hotel, so it was normal to celebrate Passover outside the church. The NCOCOG also said that although women were forbidden to preach at that time, anyone could pray for their brothers and sisters, so this was not evidence of mother. It is said that the WMSCOG helped Ahn Sahng-hong and Zahng Gil-jah take a wedding photo at the Jiangdong Wedding Hall on 18 May 1984, but there were no guests or witnesses at the wedding scene, so the photo has been controversial. Minutes provided by New Covenant Passover Church of God for the 10 January 1985 meeting state that Zahng Gil-jah was appointed as the director of social dedication and Kim Joo-cheol was the director of mission. On 19 April 1985, Kim Joo-cheol wrote to the Busan General Assembly that the missionary Zahng Gil-jah herself was not willing to idolize herself, so we cannot idolize her.

Death 
Following a heart attack during lunch on 24 February 1985, Ahn had a stroke en route to hospital, and died the next day, 25 February 1985 in the Catholic Maryknoll Hospital in Jung District, Busan. Ahn Sahng-hong was 67 years old. He was survived by his wife and three children.

From the time of his burial in 1985, a single tombstone stood beside the grave, the epitaph reading: "The grave of the prophet Elijah Ahn Sahng-hong." After the death of his wife Hwang Won-sun 23 years later on 4 September 2008, she was buried in the plot beside Ahn, and a new tombstone carrying both their names (as well as their children's on the back) replaced the 1985 stone, repeating the epitaph.

Legacy 
The unexpected death of Ahn gave rise to a power struggle within Church of God Jesus Witnesses: some people in the church wanted to continue along the lines laid out by Ahn, others wanted to re-introduce the concept of a "spiritual mother" embodied in the then 41-year-old woman named Zahng Gil-jah (born 1943). After an extraordinary general meeting in Church of God Jesus Witnesses on 4 March 1985 failed to reconcile the opposing factions, a schism divided the church into two sects

 New Covenant Passover Church of God,
 Witnesses of Ahn Sahng-hong Church of God.

New Covenant Passover Church of God 
One group of people in Church of God Jesus Witnesses stayed on the premises in Busan. Among them were Ahn's wife and their three children. According to the minutes they provided on 10 January 1985, the church was renamed as New Covenant Passover Church of God. Ahn's son Ahn Kwang-sup (born 1954) is an elder in the church and continues to expound on his father's work. They opposed the doctrine of God the mother of the "Witnesses of Ahn Sahng-hong Church of God". They claimed that they had 25 truth books published by Ahn Sahng-hong, 37 books about his growth and 10 handwritten notes. At present, there are seven churches in total, including Songpa Church in Seoul. The church observes the Sabbath and seven feasts, including Passover. Due to the calculation of feasts, Church of God Jesus Witnesses in Gwangan-ri, Busan was to be independent from the New Covenant Passover Church of God in 2016 and also oppose God the mother doctrine.

An outside observer visited the church and had this comment:

Witnesses of Ahn Sahng-hong Church of God 

Another group of people in Church of God Jesus Witnesses including the man Kim Joo-cheol and the woman Zahng Gil-jah wanted to re-introduce the concept of a "spiritual mother", and on 22 March 1985 moved from Busan to Seoul. On a meeting in Seoul on 2 June 1985, they discussed how to call Zahng Gil-jah, and established a church called Witnesses of Ahn Sahng-hong Church of God. Two major new doctrines were codified

 Ahn Sahng-hong should be regarded as Jesus Christ who had already come, should be titled Christ Ahn Sahng-hong, and pursuant to a traditional trinitarian view of Christian hypostasis Ahn was consequently also The Holy Spirit, God the Father, and thus God.
 Zahng Gil-jah should be regarded as God the Mother, a female image of God, be titled Heavenly Mother, or simply Mother, and together with Ahn Sahng-hong be regarded as God.

A change in religious practice, as reflected in the change of name from "Jesus Witnesses" to "Witnesses of Ahn Sahng-hong", was, that prayers were no longer conducted in the name of Jesus Christ but in the name of Christ Ahn Sahng-hong.

The deification of Ahn Sahng-hong and Zahng Gil-jah has been "harshly criticized," and has led to the church being officially condemned by The National Council of Churches in Korea as an interdenominationally combatted, blasphemous, heretical cult.

Around 1997, Witnesses of Ahn Sahng-hong Church of God had established a non-profit organization titled the World Mission Society Church of God for the purpose of registering and managing the organization's assets.

Evaluation

Fulfilment of prophecy 
The NCPCOG said that Ahn Sahng-hong has fulfilled the mission of stamping angels and the prophecy of the eagle of the East, questions about Elijah's mission, the news of the third angel, the prophecy of an angel with great authority, about the descendants of women, the prophecy of King David, and the reasons for the coming of Jesus Christ.

The WMSCOG and the NCPCOG was agreed that Ahn Sahng-hong was God.

1988 failed doomsday prophecy 
Witnesses of Ahn Sahng-hong Church of God announced that "1988 is the end of the world" citing  as Ahn had done in his 1980 book The Mystery of God and the Spring of the Water of Life. A few thousand members of Witnesses of Ahn Sahng-hong Church of God gathered on a mountain in Sojeong-myeon, Yeongi County, South Chungcheong Province awaiting the coming of Christ Ahn Sahng-hong, preparing for the rapture and the salvation of 144,000 souls. When Ahn failed to appear and nothing happened the church updated their apocalyptic forecast and scheduled it to the opening of the 1988 Olympics in Seoul later that year where the members gathered and preached the end of the world would come by the end of 1988 and that Ahn Sahng Hong would come again. WMSCOG later claimed it was a fulfillment of the preaching of Jonah.

Controversy over the date of baptism 
As a central argument to the claim that Ahn Sahng-hong should be the Second Coming of Jesus, and in turn an argument for his suggested promotion of Zahng Gil-jah to the Bride of the Lamb, is the proposition that he fulfilled a Davidic prophecy by preaching 37 years from his baptism 16 December 1948 to his death on 25 February 1985, a period which in reality was only 36 years, 2 months, and 9 days. It is said that Ahn Sahng-hong once wrote that he was baptized in 1948, however, the source for the baptismal date of 16 December 1948 performed by a Pastor Lee Myeong-deok in Incheon is however obscure, and no written record exists. In 2011 a protocol from the Seventh-day Adventist Church was discovered, stating Ahn was baptised when he was 36 years old on 9 October 1954 by a Pastor Gim Seo-gyeong. The investigation by International Korean Christian Coalition Against Heresy showed, that while Pastor Gim could be confirmed, no Pastor Lee Myeong-deok was with the church in 1948, reducing the length of the ministry of Ahn from 36 years to 30 years and 4 months.

See also 
 List of messiah claimants
 List of people claimed to be Jesus

Footnotes

Notes

References

External links 
 The New Covenant Passover Church of God
 World Mission Society Church of God
Church of God Jesus Witnesses

1918 births
1985 deaths
20th-century apocalypticists
Converts to Protestantism from Buddhism
People disfellowshipped by the Seventh-day Adventist Church
People from Jangsu County
People from North Jeolla Province
Self-declared messiahs
Deified Korean people